The 87th season of the Campeonato Gaúcho kicked off on January 20, 2007 and ended on May 6, 2007. The competition began with 18 clubs divided into two groups. Even before the end of first stage, Glória, Gaúcho, Guarani de Venâncio Aires and São José de Cachoeira do Sul were already relegated. The two biggest clubs of Rio Grande do Sul would not meet at the final, as Internacional were eliminated in the first stage. Holders Grêmio won the title once more after beating Juventude. That was the 35th title in the history of the club.

Participating teams

System 
The championship would have four stages:

 First stage: The 18 teams were divided in 2 groups of 9 teams each. They played against each other inside their groups in a double round-robin system. After 18 rounds, the top team of each group qualified to the Semifinals, the second and third-placed teams advanced to the Second round and the bottom two teams from each group were relegated to the Second Level.
 Second stage: The Second and third-placed teams of each group would face each other in a single match to define the two teams that would qualify to the Semifinals.
 Semifinals: The Second stage winners and the Group winners were divided in 2 groups of 2 teams each and they played in a double round-robin system. Teams with best overall record played the second leg at home.
 Finals: Semifinals winners played in two matches to define the Champions. The team with best overall record played the second leg at home.

Championship

First stage

Group 1

Group 2

Second stage

Semifinals

Finals

References 

Campeonato Gaúcho seasons
Gaúcho